Robert F. Griffin, CSC (October 7, 1925 – October 20, 1999) was a Catholic Priest for the Congregation of Holy Cross at the University of Notre Dame.

Biography
Robert "Griff" Griffin was born in Portland, Maine, where he attended Deering High School. A Baptist convert to Catholicism, he entered the novitiate upon graduation from Notre Dame in 1949 and was ordained a priest for the Eastern Province of the Congregation of Holy Cross in 1954. He received a master's degree in English from the University of Notre Dame in 1957 and did graduate work at Boston University before joining the faculty at Stonehill College, Easton, Massachusetts.

He returned to Notre Dame to serve as assistant rector of Keenan Hall in 1967 and became rector of Keenan in 1969. He was appointed in 1974 to the newly created post of University chaplain, serving until health problems forced his retirement.  During his time at Notre Dame, "Griff" became famous for presiding at a popular "Urchin Mass" for children and their parents on campus.  He also hosted a Saturday morning children's radio program on the student run radio station, WSND-FM, entitled "The Children's Hour."  In 1973 he was elected Notre Dame's Senior Class Fellow, an honor which had until then been reserved for nationally prominent people.  He spent his summers ministering to the homeless of Greenwich Village in New York City.

Griffin was known widely for his weekly article in Our Sunday Visitor entitled "Everyday Spirituality," or his column in the Notre Dame student newspaper, The Observer, entitled "Letters to a Lonely God."  His essays appeared in three collections: In The Kingdom of the Lonely God, I Never Said I Didn't Love You, and The Continuing Conversation.

References

External links 
 Honoring the 'angels' of Notre Dame
 In the Shadow of the Dome

1925 births
1999 deaths
Congregation of Holy Cross
Deering High School alumni
Notre Dame College of Arts and Letters alumni
Writers from Portland, Maine
Converts to Roman Catholicism from Baptist denominations
Boston University alumni
Catholics from Indiana